2019–20 UAE Division two was the first UAE Division two season. The competition was created to create more clubs and increase the number of players in UAE. The season will feature 10 teams, 4 from Abu Dhabi, 4 from Dubai and 1 from Ras Al Khaimah and Ajman respectively. The season was cancelled due to the COVID-19 pandemic in the United Arab Emirates.

Stadia and locations
''Note: Table lists clubs in alphabetical order.

League table

Results

Number of teams by Emirates

References

2019–20 in Emirati football